Khmer Renovation Party, also translated as Khmer Renewal Party, was an anti-communist, nationalist and royalist political party founded in Cambodia in September 1947. In 1955, it became one of the core elements of the Sangkum political movement of then Prince Norodom Sihanouk.

The party is mainly significant because key members Lon Nol and Prince Sisowath Sirik Matak would go on to lead the right-wing coup of 1970 against Sihanouk and his Sangkum regime.

History

The party was formed by the politician and soldier Nhiek Tioulong and police chief Lon Nol. Its nominal leader was the respected Prince Sisowath Monipong, one of the two sons of King Sisowath Monivong and one of the candidates for the throne passed over in favour of Sihanouk in 1941. Other prominent members included Chau Sen Cocsal Chhum, who acted as an adviser to Tioulong and Nol in founding the party, and Chuop Hell.

The party, known informally as the "Renos", had a socially conservative and royalist programme - albeit far more pro-independence than that of the similarly conservative Liberal Party of Prince Norodom Norindeth - and attracted high-ranking bureaucrats and several members of the royal family as well as military officers. Khmer Renovation's "quasi-feudalist" perspective, which emphasised Cambodia and its monarchy's place in world history and the postcolonial order, was symbolised by its chosen symbol of the Earth Goddess superimposed on a map of the protectorate. It published a newspaper, Khmera or Rénovation, in both French and Khmer versions. Monipong was to become the Prime Minister of a 'unity' government between June 1950 and February 1951.

Lon Nol led the party to the polls in the 1951 elections, where - despite receiving 9.1% of the total vote - it won a total of 2 seats in the Assembly.

Although the Khmer Renovation Party had only limited electoral success - neither Lon Nol nor Sirik Matak, later to become prominent politicians, won seats while a party member - it became one of the main political groupings behind the formation of the Sangkum of Prince Sihanouk. Nhiek Tioulong was to become Prime Minister under the Sangkum, and was later to become a prominent figure in the pro-royalist FUNCINPEC organisation. Lon Nol was also to become Prime Minister, but along with Sirik Matak was to lead the 1970 coup deposing Sihanouk and instigating the Khmer Republic.

References

1947 establishments in French Indochina
1955 disestablishments in Cambodia
Buddhist political parties
Defunct political parties in Cambodia
Monarchist parties in Cambodia
Nationalist parties in Cambodia
Political parties disestablished in 1955
Political parties established in 1947